Thibault is a French personal name and surname, a form of Theobald, a Germanic name composed from the elements  theod- "people" and bald "bold".

Surname
 Arthur Thibault (191483), Canadian farmer and political figure in Saskatchewan
 Bernard Thibault (born 1959), French trade unionist, Secretary of the Confédération Générale du Travail (CGT)
 Conrad Thibault (190387), American baritone vocalist
 David Thibault (born before 2013), French-Canadian singer and Elvis impersonator
 Dominique Thibault (born 1988), Canadian ice hockey player
 Emmanuel Thibault (born 1974), French dancer
 François-Anatole Thibault (18441924), French writer and Nobel Laureate
 François Thibault (born before 1992), French Maître de chai (Cellar Master)
 Geneviève Thibault de Chambure (190275), French musicologist
 Gérard Thibault d'Anvers (15741629), Dutch fencing master
 Guy Thibault (born before 1978), Canadian army officer
 Jean-Baptiste Thibault (181079), Canadian Roman Catholic priest and missionary
 Joachim Thibault de Courville (died 1581), French composer, singer, lutenist, and player of the lyre, of the late Renaissance
 Jocelyn Thibault (born 1975), Canadian ice hockey goaltender
 Lise Thibault (born 1939), Canadian civil servant and former Lieutenant Governor of Quebec 
 Louis Michel Thibault (17501815), French-born South African architect and engineer 
 Louise Thibault (born 1947), Canadian politician
 Mike Thibault (born 1951), American professional basketball head coach
 Olivette Thibault (1914–1995), Canadian stage, film and television actress
 Robert Thibault (born 1959), Canadian politician
 Romain Thibault (born 1991), French footballer
 Sophie Thibault (born 1961), Canadian journalist and television reporter
 Victor Thibault (1867after 1900), French archer who competed in the 1900 Olympic Games

Personal name
 Thibault Bazin (born 1984), French politician
 Thibault Bourgeois (born 1990), French footballer
 Thibault Corbaz (born 1994), Swiss footballer
 Thibault Damour (born 1951), French physicist
 Thibault Dubarry (born 1987), French rugby union player
 Thibaut Duval (AKA Thibault, born 1979), Belgian pole vaulter
 Thibault Giresse (born 1981), French footballer
 Thibault Godefroy (born 1985), French bobsledder
 Thibault Isabel (born 1978), French writer and publisher
 Thibault Lacroix (born 1985), French rugby union player
 Thibault Marchal (born 1986), French footballer
 Thibault de Montbrial (born 1969), French lawyer
 Thibault Moulin (born 1990), French footballer
 Thibault Scotto (born 1978), French footballer
 Yves-Thibault de Silguy (born 1948), French and European politician
 Thibault Tchicaya (born 1983), Gabonese international footballer
 Thibault Vinçon (born 1976), French film and theater actor
 Thibault Visensang (born 1991), French rugby union player
 Aaron Thibeaux "T-Bone" Walker (1910-1975), American blues gitarist

Places
 Saint-Thibault (disambiguation), various places
 Saint-Thibault-des-Vignes, a commune in the Seine-et-Marne department in the Île-de-France region in north-central France
 Thibault, New Brunswick, a Canadian community

Other uses
 Château de Thibault de Termes, a medieval castle in the French town of Termes-d'Armagnac, in the Gers département
 The Thibaults (French: Les Thibault), an eight-part serial novel by Roger Martin du Gard
 1 Thibault Square (the LG Building or the BP Centre), a skyscraper in Cape Town, South Africa
 Thibault, a minor character in the cartoon strip Peanuts
 A pet lobster kept by Gerard de Nerval

See also
 Thibaud (disambiguation)
 Thibaut
 Thibeault (disambiguation)
 Thiébaut (disambiguation)
 Tim Tebow
 

French-language surnames